Dog Day is a 1984 film by French director Yves Boisset starring Lee Marvin. A criminal shows up at a farmhouse with the law on his heels and several million dollars in his possession. The supporting cast includes Tina Louise and Juliet Mills.

Cast
Lee Marvin	as Jimmy Cobb
Miou-Miou	as Jessica
Jean Carmet as Socrate
Victor Lanoux as	Horace
David Bennent as Chim
Bernadette Lafont as Ségolène
 as Lily
Tina Louise as Noémie Blue
Jean-Claude Dreyfus as Le Barrec
Muni as Gusta
Juliet Mills as Maggy
Julien Bukowski as Rojinski
Jean-Roger Milo as Julio
Joseph Momo as Doudou Cadillac
Henri Guybet as Marceau

References

External links
 Dog Day in the Internet Movie Database

1984 films
Films directed by Yves Boisset
Films with screenplays by Michel Audiard
Films scored by Francis Lai
1980s French films